Kate Loveland is an Australian fertility researcher.

Profile
Loveland received her undergraduate and PhD degrees at Duke University in the United States, studying the molecular basis of mammalian fertilization. She then engaged in postdoctoral studies at Howard Hughes Medical Institute with the University of Texas, before moving to Australia in 1989 to join Monash University.

Loveland is a National Health and Medical Research Council of Australia senior research fellow (since 2000) and is a fellow of the Society for the Study of Reproduction. She is a research group head for Testis Development and Male Germ Cell Biology, and head of Postgraduate Studies, School of Clinical Sciences at Monash Health.

Loveland has published over 130 peer-reviewed manuscripts, and is an Associate Editor for Andrology. Her laboratory investigates the molecular and cellular mechanisms that underpin mammalian testis development and sperm production. The team's objective is to identify and characterize the molecular switches that regulate cell fate decisions in sperm precursor cells (germ cells) and in the somatic cells that support them.  Specific research focus areas are : Signaling by activin/ TGFβ superfamily, Wnt and Hedgehog pathways, growth factor/hormone signaling cross-talk, and the contribution of regulated nuclear transport molecules to cellular development and stress responses.

Honors and awards
Fellow of National Health and Medical Research Council of Australia Senior Research, since 2000
Fellow of the Society for the Study of Reproduction
Young Andrologist Award from American Society for Andrology, 2004
Vice Chancellor's Award for Excellence in Postgraduate Supervision at Monash University, 2010
Granted an Honorary Liebig Professorship from the Justus-Liebig University in Giessen, Germany, 2014

Boards and Committees
Founder and Chair of the Basic Science Workshop
President of Women in Andrology and Council member
Founder and Chair of Society for the Study of Reproduction
Chair of International Members Subcommittee for Society for the Study of Reproduction
Director, and Annual Meeting Program co-Chair for Society for the study of Reproduction. (2017).

References

Year of birth missing (living people)
Living people
Australian medical researchers
American emigrants to Australia
Australian women scientists